Coraline is a 2002 novella by the British writer Neil Gaiman.

Coraline may also refer to:

Related to the novel
 Coraline (film), 2009 animated film
 Coraline (video game), 2009 video game based on the film
 Coraline (musical), 2009 musical
 Coraline (opera), 2018 opera by Mark-Anthony Turnage
 "Coraline", a song by Rasputina from Where's Neil When You Need Him?, a 2006 tribute album based on Gaiman's works

Other uses 
 Coraline (given name), the given name
 "Coraline" (song), a song by Måneskin from Teatro d'ira: Vol. I (2021)
 Coraline Duvall, a vampire in Moonlight (TV series)
 Coraline, a character in Adolphe Adam's 1849 opera Le toréador
 Coraline, a material used to make a corset bone

Characters 
 Coraline Jones, silent film actress in the 1920s.

See also

Coralline (disambiguation)